Scopula curvimargo is a moth of the  family Geometridae. It is found in Kenya, South Africa, Tanzania, Zambia and Zimbabwe.

References

Moths described in 1900
curvimargo
Moths of Africa